Michael Wall (born July 25, 1985) is a Canadian former professional ice hockey goaltender who played in the National Hockey League with the Anaheim Ducks.

Playing career
Wall was born in Telkwa, British Columbia. He began his career by playing for the Prince George Cougars of the Western Hockey League. During his third season with the Cougars, he was moved to the new Everett Silvertips, where he finished his record-setting junior career. Following the 2004–05 WHL season, he was signed to a three-year entry level contract by the Anaheim Ducks on September 29, 2005.

He began his professional career immediately, making his first professional start with the Ducks' AHL affiliate, the Portland Pirates on October 8, 2005, and earning his first win on October 14 against the Providence Bruins. However, after he played in eight games with the Pirates, he was called up to the Ducks to back up Ilya Bryzgalov while Jean-Sébastien Giguère was injured. He then proceeded to finish his rookie season by splitting time with the Ducks' ECHL affiliate, the Augusta Lynx, as well as the Pirates.

Wall began the season with the Pirates, but was called up for his first NHL start on November 26, 2006, as both Bryzgalov and Giguère were injured at the same time. Wall picked up his first win that night against the Calgary Flames. He made four total appearances with the Ducks, including three starts, and on February 27, 2007, he was traded to the Colorado Avalanche for Brad May at the trade deadline. The Avalanche then decided to move Wall to their CHL affiliate, the Arizona Sundogs where he scored a goal while playing with them which was just the 2nd goal by a goaltender in league history.

Wall Spent the 2007–08 season with Colorado's AHL affiliate, the Lake Erie Monsters in their inaugural season. Wall was a restricted free agent at the end of the season and was offered a contract by the Colorado Avalanche but turned it down.

Wall now tends goal for his hometown Smithers Steelheads, a "AA" senior hockey club operating in the Central Interior Hockey League (CIHL).

Records
Everett Silvertips franchise record for best career save percentage: .928

Career statistics

References
Anaheim Ducks
(5 Dec 2006). Ducks Recall Wall. Press release.
(29 Dec 2006). Ducks vs. Hurricanes at 4:00 p.m.. Press release.
Michael Wall. Retrieved 29 Dec 2006.
Arizona Sundogs. (3 March 2006). Sundogs Assigned Netminder by Colorado. Press release.
Augusta Lynx
(2 Dec 2005). Lynx Acquire Two From Roadrunners, Add Goaltender From Anaheim. Press release.
(27 Nov 2006). Former Lynx Goalie Notches First Nhl Win. Press release.
Colorado Avalanche. (27 Feb 2007).  Avalanche Acquires G Michael Wall From Anaheim. Press release.
Everett Silvertips. All- Time Career Individual Statistics. Retrieved 29 Dec 2006.
Everett Silvertips. Everett Silvertips All Time Regular Season Team Records ("After 4 Seasons"). Retrieved 7 May 2006
Internet Hockey Database. Mike Wall. Retrieved 1 Jan 2007.
Portland Pirates
2005-06 Season in Review. Retrieved 29 Dec 2006.
Mike Wall. Retrieved 29 Dec 2006.
Sports Network, The. Mike Wall. Retrieved 29 Dec 2006.

External links

1985 births
Anaheim Ducks players
Arizona Sundogs players
Augusta Lynx players
Canadian ice hockey goaltenders
Everett Silvertips players
Ice hockey people from British Columbia
Lake Erie Monsters players
Living people
People from the Regional District of Bulkley-Nechako
Portland Pirates players
Prince George Cougars players
Undrafted National Hockey League players